The Monte Brè funicular, or Funicolare Cassarate - Monte Brè, is a funicular railway in the city of Lugano in the Swiss canton of Ticino. The line links a lower station in the Lugano suburb of Cassarate with an upper station at 883 m near the summit of the Monte Brè. The top yields views of the city and Lake Lugano.

The funicular is composed of two separate and independent sections. At Suvigliana passengers must cross the road to reach the lower station of the second, and significantly longer, section.

The Monte Brè funicular is one of three operational funiculars within the Lugano area. The other two are the Monte San Salvatore funicular, which ascends Monte San Salvatore on the opposite side of the city, and the Lugano Città–Stazione funicular, which links the city centre with the railway station.

History 
The concession for the construction of the funicular was granted in 1905, with the intention of creating a resort where the inhabitants of Lugano could, without abandoning their businesses, enjoy the cool during the heat of summer, along with the views. The lower section opened in 1908, with the upper section following in 1912.

In 1959, the cars of the lower section were replaced with the new metal-bodied cars in a then-modern style, with a capacity of 42 persons each. Similarly new cars were provided for the upper section in 1984, although in this case the cars had a capacity of 68 persons and were designed with a nostalgic look. In both cases, the cars are still in use.

Operation 
The line has the following parameters:

Notes

See also 
 List of funicular railways
 List of funiculars in Switzerland

Further reading

References

External links 

Official web site of the Monte Brè funicular
Article on the funicular from the Funimag online magazine

Funicular railways in Switzerland
Transport in Lugano
Railway lines opened in 1908
Metre gauge railways in Switzerland
1908 establishments in Switzerland